David Joseph Mahoney (born 5 October 1987) is a British conductor, producer and creative director.

Performance groups

A graduate of St Peter's College, Oxford, Mahoney is the founder and musical director of The Novello Orchestra, who have performed with artists including Kerry Ellis, Ruthie Henshall, The von Trapps, Lee Mead, Matt Cardle, and American group Pink Martini.

He is a member of Classical Brit Award winning group Only Men Aloud.

Mahoney is the Principal Conductor of The Novello Orchestra and has appeared as a Guest Conductor with orchestras including the Cape Town Philharmonic and the RTE National Symphony Orchestra.

Productions

As a creative director and producer, his shows include Broadway to the Bay as part of the Wales Millennium Centre's 10th Anniversary celebrations, The Golden Age of Dance (starring Joanne Clifton and Anton du Beke), the Opening Concert of the 2016 National Eisteddfod, and Music Supervisor for the Roald Dahl Centenary Celebrations 'City of the Unexpected'.

Mahoney is patron of Performing Arts Academy Wales, the South Glamorgan Festival for Young Musicians, and is a regular columnist for Cardiff Life Magazine. He was a judge for the 2015 Cardiff Life Awards and has appeared twice in Wales Online's Sexiest Men in Wales Top 50, appearing at number 12 in 2011.

In 2017, he conducted the UK premiere of Disney's The Jungle Book in Concert at London's Royal Festival Hall, the UK and Ireland Tour of Oscar winning film score La La Land Live in Concert (UK premiere) and acted as Music Supervisor / Musical Director for the new production 'Tiger Bay the Musical', with performances in Artscape Theatre Cape Town and Wales Millennium Centre.

For television, Mahoney has worked as a producer for Jonathan and Charlotte (ITV1) and three episodes of Songs of Praise (BBC1), whilst development work includes projects involving Dame Shirley Bassey and Sir Tom Jones.

Mahoney founded the Cardiff Music Festival in 2011 and is a visiting director at the Royal Welsh College of Music and Drama.

He was the show producer of the 2015, 2016, 2017, 2018 and 2019 BAFTA Cymru Awards (hosted by BBC Radio DJ Huw Stephens). 
Other productions include the 'Life in Song' series at London's Royal Festival Hall (for Senbla / BBC) featuring Pete Waterman, Tony Hatch, Tim Rice and Burt Bacharach.

Further productions include the UK and Ireland Tour of Disney's Beauty and the Beast film with live orchestra (conductor), the UK and Ireland Arena Tours of 'Star Wars' film with live orchestra (conductor), 'Pixar in Concert' UK Tour (conductor), UEFA Champion’s League Final (creative consultant) and the Raise Your Voice Gala at New York's Lincoln Center (creative director), starring Julie Andrews, Keith Urban, Roger Daltrey and Sam Smith.

References

External links 
 David Mahoney Productions
 The Novello Orchestra

1987 births
Living people
British male conductors (music)
British producers
Creative directors
21st-century British conductors (music)
21st-century British male musicians
People educated at The Cathedral School, Llandaff
Alumni of St Peter's College, Oxford